Lobophytum pauciflorum is a species of soft coral in the family Alcyoniidae and the genus Lobophytum.

References 

Alcyoniidae
Animals described in 1834
Taxa named by Christian Gottfried Ehrenberg